Boyle was a constituency represented in the Irish House of Commons from 1611 to 1800.

History
In the Patriot Parliament of 1689 summoned by James II, Boyle was represented with two members.

Members of Parliament, 1614–1801
1613 John Cusack and Robert Meredith 
1634–1635 Robert King and Robert Meredyth  
1639–1649 Robert King (sat for Roscommon. Replaced by Michael Burnell) and Richard Wingfield  
1661–1666 Ellis Goodwin and Owen Lloyd (both died 1665 and were replaced by John Burniston and John Stepney)

1689–1801

Notes

References

Bibliography

Constituencies of the Parliament of Ireland (pre-1801)
Historic constituencies in County Roscommon
1614 establishments in Ireland
1800 disestablishments in Ireland
Constituencies established in 1614
Constituencies disestablished in 1800